David Casablanca Poyatos (born 17 February 1977) is a Spanish retired footballer who played as a left back.

Football career
Born in El Masnou, Barcelona, Catalonia, Casablanca finished his youth career at FC Barcelona but could never break into the first team, also serving a loan at Levante UD during his spell with the former. After a two-year stint in Portugal with S.C. Freamunde and G.D. Chaves, both in the Segunda Liga, he returned to his country, signing with Segunda División B club Pontevedra CF and achieving promotion to Segunda División in his second full season.

In January 2005, Casablanca joined CD Castellón also in the third level, initially on loan. He achieved another promotion immediately as an undisputed starter, and continue to appear regularly the following campaign.

After falling out of favour (only seven league matches in two years combined), Casablanca left in summer 2008 and continued his career in amateur football, first with SD Negreira then CD Don Benito. He retired in 2012, at the age of 35.

External links

1977 births
Living people
People from El Masnou
Sportspeople from the Province of Barcelona
Spanish footballers
Footballers from Catalonia
Association football defenders
Segunda División players
Segunda División B players
Tercera División players
FC Barcelona C players
FC Barcelona Atlètic players
Levante UD footballers
CF Extremadura footballers
FC Cartagena footballers
Pontevedra CF footballers
CD Castellón footballers
Liga Portugal 2 players
S.C. Freamunde players
G.D. Chaves players
Spanish expatriate footballers
Expatriate footballers in Portugal
Spanish expatriate sportspeople in Portugal